Ivan Lucas Baitello (born 16 July 1973) is a Brazilian football manager and former player who played as a defensive midfielder. He is the current football superintendent and assistant manager of Mirassol.

Playing career
Born in São Paulo, Baitello began his career with Mirassol, and also represented Inter de Bebedouro, Araçatuba, União São João (featuring in two Série A matches in 1995), Chapecoense and América-SP before returning to Mirassol in 1997. He also played for Tuna Luso before retiring at the age of just 28, due to a spinal disc herniation.

Managerial career
After retiring, Baitello joined Mirassol's youth setup in 2000, as an under-15 manager. He became an assistant of the main squad in 2004, being also an interim manager on two occasions, before joining São Caetano ahead of the 2006 season, as the manager of the under-20 side.

Baitello was an assistant of the Azulão from the 2007 season until 26 October 2010, when he was named manager of his former side Mirassol. He opted to leave the club on 12 May 2013, to take over Série D side Botafogo-SP

Baitello left Bota on 25 August 2013, after only eight matches, as the club was knocked out from the national league. Two days later, he was named at the helm of Oeste in the Série B.

Baitello resigned from Oeste on 16 October 2013, and was named in charge of Atlético Sorocaba for the 2014 season. He left the latter club on 2 February of that year, and spent the entire season without coaching before taking over Capivariano on 28 October.

On 6 August 2015, Baitello returned to Mirassol, as a football superintendent. He subsequently began to work as an assistant coach of the club from the 2020 season onwards, before being named interim manager on 3 March 2022, after the departure of Eduardo Baptista.

References

External links

1973 births
Living people
Footballers from São Paulo
Brazilian footballers
Association football midfielders
Campeonato Brasileiro Série A players
Mirassol Futebol Clube players
Associação Atlética Internacional (Bebedouro) players
Associação Esportiva Araçatuba players
União São João Esporte Clube players
Associação Chapecoense de Futebol players
América Futebol Clube (SP) players
Tuna Luso Brasileira players
Brazilian football managers
Campeonato Brasileiro Série B managers
Campeonato Brasileiro Série D managers
Mirassol Futebol Clube managers
Associação Desportiva São Caetano managers
Botafogo Futebol Clube (SP) managers
Oeste Futebol Clube managers
Clube Atlético Sorocaba managers
Capivariano Futebol Clube managers